The Dantiwada Dam is a mud and masonry dam on the West Banas River near Dantiwada, Banaskantha district of northern Gujarat in India. The dam was constructed in 1965 mainly for irrigation and flood control.

111 total villages are under command of the Dantiwada Dam, of which 12 villages are partially submerged. Total land submerged under the reservoir include  forest land,  wasteland,  cultivable land.

It irrigated  in 1994–95.

The Dantiwada Dam failed in 1973, 8 years after it was constructed.

On 10 April 2015, Government of Gujarat declared  for the Dantiwada Dam oriented group water supply project benefiting 123 villages of three talukas.

References

Banaskantha district
Dams in Gujarat
Masonry dams
Dams completed in 1965
Tourist attractions in Banaskantha district
1965 establishments in Gujarat
20th-century architecture in India